The Ambassador of the Republic of the Philippines to France is the Republic of the Philippines' foremost diplomatic representative in the French Republic. As head of the Philippines' diplomatic mission there, the Ambassador is the official representative of the President and the Government of the Philippines to the President and Government of France. The position has the rank and status of an Ambassador Extraordinary and Plenipotentiary and is based at the embassy located in Paris' 16th arrondissement. The Philippine ambassador to France is also accredited as non-resident ambassador to the Principality of Monaco, with whom it established formal ties in 2016.

Head of mission

See also 
 France–Philippines relations

Notes and References 

France
Philippines